Roman Vodyanov (born 25 November 1982, Kudymkar) is a Russian political figure and a deputy of the 8th State Duma.
 
In 2008, Vodyanov founded and headed the Uralbur company. From 2013 to 2014, he was the deputy of the Dvurechenskoye rural settlement. In 2014-2016, he was the deputy of the Zemsky Assembly of the Perm Municipal District. From 2016 to 2021, he was elected to the Legislative Assembly of Perm Krai. In 2020, he was appointed Advisor to the Acting Governor of Perm Krai Dmitry Makhonin. Since September 2021, he has served as deputy of the 8th State Duma.

References
 

 

1982 births
Living people
United Russia politicians
21st-century Russian politicians
Eighth convocation members of the State Duma (Russian Federation)